Makarov may refer to:


Places
 Makarov, Russia,  a town in Sakhalin Oblast
 Makarov Basin, in the Arctic Ocean
 Makariv, a town in Ukraine, often known by the Russian form

People 
 Makarov (Hasidic dynasty)
 Makarov (surname)

Other uses
 5545 Makarov, an asteroid
 9×18mm Makarov, a pistol cartridge
 Makarov PM, a semi-automatic pistol

See also
 Admiral Makarov (disambiguation)
 
 Makarovsky (disambiguation)